Jeet Ram Katwal is a former Indian IAS officer and an MLA from the Jhanduta (Vidhan Sabha constituency) of Himachal Pradesh.

References

Year of birth missing (living people)
Himachal Pradesh MLAs 2017–2022
Living people
Bharatiya Janata Party politicians from Himachal Pradesh